Sedale Threatt Jr. (born October 17, 1981) is an American former professional basketball player who played as a point guard in Australia's BIG V Basketball League.

Career
Threatt played for Latrobe City Energy (2005), Melbourne Tigers Championship Men (2006–2007), Sandringham Sabers (2008–2009) and Waverley Falcons (2010–2016). Throughout his career in the BIG V, Threatt was awarded the BIG V Golden Hands (4 Awards), the BIG V Finals MVP and was named in the BIG V All Star Team.

Threatt is the founder and owner of Australian Basketball Development (AUBD), where he and his father train and develop junior basketball players in Australia.

Threatt is also known as the "Unguardable Guard" for his production of UNGUARDABLE, a basketball ball handling tutorial in which he demonstrates 100 different basketball moves. Highlights from his Unguardable tutorial are featured on Threatt's YouTube channel, AUBD Basketball.

Personal life 
Born in Atlanta, Georgia, Threatt is the eldest son of retired NBA player Sedale Threatt and Desiree White. Threatt and his father currently work together in Australian Basketball Development AUBD in Australia. He has a younger half-brother, also named Sedale Threatt Jr., who is an actor.

References

External links 
 http://www.aubd.com.au/
 https://aubd.online/
 http://www.unguardable.com.au/
 Waverley stats

1981 births
Living people
Point guards
American expatriate basketball people in Australia
Basketball players from Atlanta
Sandringham Sabres players
American men's basketball players